Forcefield is the third studio album released by the Canadian band Tokyo Police Club on March 24, 2014 through Mom + Pop in North America and Memphis Industries in the UK/Europe.

Critical reception

At Alternative Press, Bree Davies rated the album four stars out of five, writing that the release "makes good on being more than just a referential record" on which it "doesn't feel like enough of a good thing."

Track listing

Personnel 

 Dave Monks – producer, songwriter, musician
 Graham Wright – songwriter, musician
 Josh Hooks – songwriter, musician
 Greg Alsop – songwriter, musician
 Doug Boehm – producer, engineer
 Mark Needham – mixing, additional production, songwriting (tracks: 6, 8)
 Tim Pagnotta – songwriting (track: 2)
 Chris Stringer – additional production
 Blackbear – additional production (tracks: 6,8)
 Jared Hirshland – engineer
 Jason Dufour – engineer
 Jeff Pelletier – engineer
 Will Brierre – assistant mixing

 Luke McCutcheon – artwork
 Oscar Saragossi – artwork
 Stuart Pearce – artwork
 Trevor Wheatley – artwork

References

2014 albums
Tokyo Police Club albums
Dine Alone Records albums
Memphis Industries albums
Mom + Pop Music albums
Albums produced by Doug Boehm